This article contains information about the literary events and publications of 1935.

Events
January – The first published portions of Yasunari Kawabata's novel Snow Country (雪国, Yukiguni) appear as standalone stories in Japanese literature.
March 20 – The London publisher Boriswood pleads guilty and is fined in Manchester's Assize Court for publishing an "obscene" book, a 1934 cheap edition of James Hanley's 1931 novel Boy.
May 13 – T. E. Lawrence, having left the British Royal Air Force in March, has an accident with his Brough Superior motorcycle while returning to his cottage at Clouds Hill, England, after posting books to a friend, A. E. "Jock" Chambers, and sending a telegram inviting the novelist Henry Williamson to lunch. He dies six days later. On July 29 his Seven Pillars of Wisdom is first published in an edition for general circulation.
June 15
British poet W. H. Auden contracts a marriage of convenience with exiled German anti-Nazi actress and writer Erika Mann, homosexual like him.
T. S. Eliot's verse drama Murder in the Cathedral is premièred, at Canterbury Cathedral, the setting for the action of the play.
July 30 – Allen Lane founds Penguin Books, as the first mass-market paperbacks in Britain.
August – Open-air reading room established by New York Public Library in Bryant Park.
August 27 – The Federal Theatre Project is established in the United States.
September 5 – Michael Joseph is founded as a publisher in London.
November 2 – The Scottish-born thriller writer John Buchan, 1st Baron Tweedsmuir, is sworn in as Governor General of Canada.
November 7 – The British and Foreign Blind Association introduces a library of talking books for the visually impaired.
November 26 – Scrooge, the first feature-length talking film version of Dickens' A Christmas Carol (1843) is released in Britain. Sir Seymour Hicks reprises the title rôle, which he has performed for decades on stage.
unknown dates
The library journal Die Bucherei in Nazi Germany publishes guidelines for books to be removed from library shelves and destroyed: all those by Jewish authors, Marxist and pacifist literature, and anything critical of the state.
The first published edition of the Marquis de Sade's The 120 Days of Sodom (Les 120 journées de Sodome), written in 1785, in a scholarly edition as a literary text, is completed.
Fredric Warburg and Roger Senhouse retrieve the London publishers Martin Secker from receivership, as Secker & Warburg.

New books

Fiction
Nelson Algren – Somebody in Boots
Mulk Raj Anand – Untouchable
Enid Bagnold – National Velvet
Jorge Luis Borges – A Universal History of Infamy (Historia universal de la infamia, collected short stories)
Elizabeth Bowen – The House in Paris
Pearl S. Buck – A House Divided
John Bude – The Lake District Murder
Edgar Rice Burroughs – Tarzan and the Leopard Men
Dino Buzzati – Il segreto del Bosco Vecchio
Erskine Caldwell – Journeyman
Morley Callaghan – They Shall Inherit the Earth
Elias Canetti – Die Blendung
John Dickson Carr
Death-Watch
The Hollow Man (also The Three Coffins)
The Red Widow Murders (as Carter Dickson)
The Unicorn Murders (as Carter Dickson)
Agatha Christie
Three Act Tragedy
Death in the Clouds
Solomon Cleaver – Jean Val Jean
Robert P. Tristram Coffin – Red Sky in the Morning
Jack Conroy – A World to Win
Freeman Wills Crofts – Crime at Guildford
A. J. Cronin – The Stars Look Down
H. L. Davis – Honey in the Horn
 Cecil Day-Lewis – A Question of Proof
Franklin W. Dixon – The Hidden Harbor Mystery
Lawrence Durrell – Pied Piper of Lovers
E. R. Eddison – Mistress of Mistresses
Susan Ertz
Now We Set Out
Woman Alive, But Now Dead
James T. Farrell – Studs Lonigan – A Trilogy
Rachel Field – Time Out of Mind
Charles G. Finney – The Circus of Dr. Lao
 Anthony Gilbert – The Man Who Was Too Clever
Graham Greene – England Made Me
George Wylie Henderson – Ollie Miss
Harold Heslop – Last Cage Down
Georgette Heyer
Death in the Stocks
Regency Buck
Christopher Isherwood – Mr Norris Changes Trains
Pamela Hansford Johnson – This Bed Thy Centre
Anna Kavan (writing as Helen Ferguson) – A Stranger Still
Sinclair Lewis – It Can't Happen Here
E. C. R. Lorac 
Death of an Author
The Organ Speaks
August Mälk – Õitsev Meri (The Flowering Sea)
André Malraux – Le Temps du mépris
Ngaio Marsh 
 Enter a Murderer
 The Nursing Home Murder
John Masefield – The Box of Delights
Gladys Mitchell – The Devil at Saxon Wall
Naomi Mitchison – We Have Been Warned
Alberto Moravia – Le ambizioni sbagliate
R. K. Narayan – Swami and Friends
John O'Hara – BUtterfield 8
George Orwell – A Clergyman's Daughter
N. Porsenna – Se-aprind făcliile (They're Lighting Torches)
Ellery Queen
The Spanish Cape Mystery
The Lamp of God
Charles Ferdinand Ramuz – When the Mountain Fell
Marjorie Kinnan Rawlings – Golden Apples
Ernest Raymond – We, The Accused
Herbert Read – The Green Child
George Santayana – The Last Puritan
Dorothy L. Sayers – Gaudy Night
Monica Shannon – Dobry
Howard Spring – Rachel Rosing
Eleanor Smith – Tzigane
John Steinbeck – Tortilla Flat
Rex Stout – The League of Frightened Men
Cecil Street 
 The Corpse in the Car
 Hendon's First Case
 Mystery at Olympia
Alan Sullivan – The Great Divide
Phoebe Atwood Taylor
Deathblow Hill
The Tinkling Symbol
A. A. Thomson – The Exquisite Burden
B. Traven – The Treasure of the Sierra Madre
Violet Trefusis – Broderie Anglaise
S. S. Van Dine – The Garden Murder Case
I. C. Vissarion – Învietorul de morți (Raiser of the Dead)
Henry Wade – Heir Presumptive
Stanley G. Weinbaum – The Lotus Eaters
Dennis Wheatley – The Eunuch of Stamboul
Ethel Lina White – Wax
P. G. Wodehouse – Blandings Castle and Elsewhere
Xiao Hong (蕭紅) – The Field of Life and Death (生死场, Shēng sǐ chǎng)
Eiji Yoshikawa (吉川 英治) – Musashi (宮本武蔵, Miyamoto Musashi)
Francis Brett Young – White Ladies
Yumeno Kyūsaku (夢野 久作) – Dogra Magra (ドグラマグラ)

Children and young people
Enid Bagnold – National Velvet
Louise Andrews Kent – He went with Marco Polo: A Story of Venice and Cathay (first of seven in "He went with" series)
John Masefield – The Box of Delights
Kate Seredy – The Good Master
Laura Ingalls Wilder – Little House on the Prairie

Drama
J. R. Ackerley – The Prisoners of War
Maxwell Anderson – Winterset
T. S. Eliot – Murder in the Cathedral
Federico García Lorca – Doña Rosita the Spinster (Doña Rosita la soltera)
Norman Ginsbury – Viceroy Sarah
Jean Giraudoux – The Trojan War Will Not Take Place (La Guerre de Troie n'aura pas lieu)
Walter C. Hackett – Espionage
N.C. Hunter – All Rights Reserved
 Ronald Jeans – The Composite Man
Anthony Kimmins – Chase the Ace
Archibald MacLeish – Panic
Bernard Merivale – The Unguarded Hour
Clifford Odets – Waiting for Lefty
Clifford Odets – Awake and Sing! premiered February 19, 1935 at Belasco Theatre, New York
Lawrence Riley – Personal Appearance
Dodie Smith – Call It a Day
John Van Druten – Most of the Game
Emlyn Williams – Night Must Fall

Poetry
See 1935 in poetry

Non-fiction
Julian Bell, ed. – We Did Not Fight: 1914–18 Experiences of War Resisters
M. C. Bradbrook – Themes and Conventions of Elizabethan Tragedy
William Henry Chamberlin – Russia's Iron Age
Manuel Chaves Nogales – Juan Belmonte, matador de toros: su vida y sus hazañas (translated as Juan Belmonte, killer of bulls)
George Dangerfield – The Strange Death of Liberal England
Clarence Day – Life with Father
Dion Fortune – The Mystical Qabalah
Ernest Hemingway – Green Hills of Africa
Anne Morrow Lindbergh – North to the Orient
Merkantilt biografisk leksikon
Polish Biographical Dictionary (Polski słownik biograficzny)
Iris Origo – Allegra (biography of Byron's daughter) 
Caroline Spurgeon – Shakespeare's Imagery, and what it tells us
Nigel Tranter – The Fortalices and Early Mansions of Southern Scotland 1400–1650
J. Dover Wilson – What Happens in Hamlet
Thomas Wright – The Life of Charles Dickens

Births
January 2 – David McKee, English children's writer and illustrator (died 2022)
January 8 – Lewis H. Lapham, American publisher, founder of Lapham's Quarterly
January 14 – Labhshankar Thakar, Indian Gujarati language poet, playwright and story writer (died 2016)
January 18 – Jon Stallworthy, English poet and literary critic (died 2014)
January 27 – D. M. Thomas, English novelist, poet and translator
January 28 – David Lodge, English novelist and academic
January 30 – Richard Brautigan, American writer and poet (died 1984)
January 31 – Kenzaburō Ōe (大江 健三郎), Japanese novelist and essayist
February 18 – Janette Oke, Canadian author
February 22 – Danilo Kiš, Serbian novelist (died 1989)
February 23 – Tom Murphy, Irish playwright (died 2018)
March 13
Kofi Awoonor, Ghanaian poet and writer (killed 2013)
David Nobbs, English comedy writer (died 2015)
March 23 – Barry Cryer, English comedy writer and performer (died 2022)
March 27 – Abelardo Castillo, Argentinian writer (died 2017)
March 31 – Judith Rossner, American novelist (died 2005)
April 4 – Michael Horovitz, German-born English poet and translator (died 2021)
April 6 – John Pepper Clark, Nigerian poet and playwright (died 2020)
April 14 – Erich von Däniken, Swiss writer on paranormal
April 15 – Alan Plater, English playwright and screenwriter (died 2010)
April 25 – Li Ao, Chinese-Taiwanese writer, social commentator, historian and independent politician (died 2018)
April 26 – Patricia Reilly Giff, American author and educator
May 1 – Julian Mitchell, English playwright and screenwriter 
May 2 – Lynda Lee-Potter, English columnist (died 2004)
May 9 – Roger Hargreaves, English children's author and illustrator (died 1988)
May 29 – André Brink, South African novelist (died 2015)
June 2 – Carol Shields, American-born writer (died 2003)
June 4 – Shiao Yi, Taiwanese-American wuxia novelist (d. 2018)
June 7 – Harry Crews, American author and playwright (died 2012)
June 24 – Pete Hamill, American journalist and author (died 2020)
June 25
Corinne Chevallier, Algerian historian and novelist
Larry Kramer, American playwright, author, film producer and LGBT activist (died 2020).
Fran Ross, African-American satirist (died 1985)
June 30 – Peter Achinstein, American philosopher
July 11 – Günther von Lojewski, German journalist, television presenter and author (died 2023)
July 13 – Earl Lovelace, Trinidadian novelist and playwright
August 1 – Mohinder Pratap Chand, Urdu poet, writer and language advocate (died 2020)
August 15 – Régine Deforges, French dramatist, novelist and publisher (died 2014)
August 21 – Yuri Entin, Soviet and Russian poet, lyricist and playwright
August 22 – E. Annie Proulx, American novelist
September 5 – Ward Just, American novelist (died 2019)
September 10 – Mary Oliver, American poet (died 2019)
September 16 – Esther Vilar, German-Argentinian writer
September 17 – Ken Kesey, American novelist (died 2001)
October 7 – Thomas Keneally, Australian novelist and non-fiction writer
November 1 – Edward Said, Palestinian-American literary critic (died 2003)
November 7
Elvira Quintana, Spanish-Mexican actress, singer, and poet (died 1968)
Willibrordus S. Rendra, Indonesian dramatist, poet, activist, performer, actor and director (died 2009)
November 9 – Jerry Hopkins, American journalist and biographer (died 2018) 
November 18
Sam Abrams, American poet
Rodney Hall, Australian author and poet
November 22 – Hugh C. Rae (Jessica Stirling, etc.), Scottish novelist (died 2014)
December 5 – Yevgeny Titarenko, Soviet writer (died 2018)
December 10 – Shūji Terayama (寺山 修司), Japanese avant-garde writer, film director and photographer (died 1983)
December 13
Eyvindur P. Eiríksson, Icelandic poet and novelist
Adélia Prado, Brazilian writer and poet
unknown date – Bahaa Taher, Egyptian writer

Deaths

February 7 – Lewis Grassic Gibbon, Scottish novelist (peritonitis, born 1901)
February 13 – Ioan Bianu, Romanian librarian, bibliographer and linguist (uremia, born 1856 or 1857)
February 28 – Tsubouchi Shōyō (坪内 逍遥), Japanese writer (born 1859)
April 6 – Edwin Arlington Robinson, American poet (born 1869)
April 11 – Anna Katharine Green, American crime writer (born 1846)
April 16 – Panait Istrati, Romanian novelist, short story writer and political essayist (tuberculosis, born 1884)
May 19 – T. E. Lawrence (Lawrence of Arabia), English historian and memoirist (motorcycle accident, born 1888)
June 29 – Hayashi Fubo, Japanese novelist (born 1900)
July 17 – George William Russell, Irish nationalist, poet and artist (born 1867)
August 11 – Sir William Watson, English poet (born 1858)
August 17 – Charlotte Perkins Gilman, American novelist (born 1860)
August 30 – Henri Barbusse, French novelist and journalist (pneumonia, born 1873)
September 26 – Iván Persa, Hungarian Slovene writer and priest (born 1861)
September 29 – Winifred Holtby, English novelist (Bright's disease, born 1898)
October 11 – Steele Rudd, Australian short story writer (born 1868)
November 4 – Ella Loraine Dorsey, American author, journalist and translator (born 1853)
November 28
Mary R. Platt Hatch, American author (born 1848)
Louise Manning Hodgkins, American educator, author, editor (born 1846)
November 29 – Mary G. Charlton Edholm, American journalist and temperance reformer (born 1854)
November 30 – Fernando Pessoa, Portuguese poet, philosopher and critic (cirrhosis, born 1888)
December 14 – Stanley G. Weinbaum, American science-fiction author (born 1902)
December 17 – Lizette Woodworth Reese, American poet (born 1856)
December 21 – Kurt Tucholsky, German journalist and satirist (drug overdose, born 1890)
December 28 – Clarence Day, American writer (born 1874)

Awards
James Tait Black Memorial Prize for fiction: L. H. Myers, The Root and the Flower
James Tait Black Memorial Prize for biography: R. W. Chambers, Thomas More
Newbery Medal for children's literature: Monica Shannon, Dobry
Nobel Prize in literature: not awarded
Pulitzer Prize for Drama: Zoë Akins, The Old Maid
Pulitzer Prize for Poetry: Audrey Wurdemann, Bright Ambush
Pulitzer Prize for the Novel: Josephine Winslow Johnson, Now in November

References

 
Years of the 20th century in literature